The flag of Norfolk Island is a triband consisting of green, white, and green bands charged with a green Norfolk Island pine in the centre.  Adopted in 1979 when the islands gained limited self-government, it has been the flag of the Territory of Norfolk Island since 6 June of that year.  The pine is native to the territory and is its official tree.

History
Norfolk Island was first sighted by James Cook in 1774 during his second voyage to the southern Pacific Ocean.  Settlers moved to the island in March 1788, when it was claimed by the colony of New South Wales.  Cook surmised that the Norfolk Island pine (Araucaria heterophylla) could be utilised for the masts of ships, but his prediction ultimately did not come to fruition.

The island was initially employed as a penal colony until 1814, and again from 1825 to 1855.  It was then used in 1856 to relocate people from the Pitcairn Islands, which had become overpopulated, and Norfolk Island was consequently designated "a distinct and separate settlement" from mainland Australia on 24 June of the same year.  It later lost its self-governing status in 1897, when the British placed the territory under the administration of the Governor of New South Wales.  The island joined the now-independent Commonwealth of Australia as a territory under the Norfolk Island Act 1913.  However, its exact constitutional relationship with the rest of the commonwealth was not enunciated at the time.

A royal commission was established in 1975 to resolve Norfolk Island's constitutional status.  Four years later, the territory was granted its own legislative assembly, but remained unrepresented in the Federal Parliament.  The bill that became the Norfolk Island Flag and Public Seal Act 1979 was introduced to the Australian Parliament that same year and received royal assent on 17 January 1980.

Design

Description
The flag of Norfolk Island is described in detail in Norfolk Island Flag and Public Seal Act 1979, federal legislation that has been in force from 17 January 1980.  It specifies the flag is to have an aspect ratio of 1:2.  The official colour scheme follows approximately the Pantone Matching System as indicated below.  The colour numbers for the flag's white shade are not specified.

Symbolism
The colours and symbols of the flag carry cultural, political, and regional meanings.  The green symbolises Norfolk Island's plentiful vegetation and fertile land.  The Norfolk Island pine is native to the islands, and is the official tree of the territory.

Similarities

The Norfolk Islander flag bears a likeness to the flag of Canada.  Both banners employ only two colours and feature a regional arboreal symbol in the middle band. Is also similar to the flag of Neuquén Province. Both banners employ only two colours and feature an araucarian tree.  Norfolk Island's flag is also analogous to the flag of Nigeria, which utilises a triband of green and white in a similar fashion.

References
Specific

Bibliography

External links
 

1979 establishments in Australia
Flags introduced in 1979
Flags of Australia
Flag
Flags of Australian states and territories